Saskatoon City was a federal electoral district in Saskatchewan, Canada, that was represented in the House of Commons of Canada from 1935 to 1949.

History
This riding was created in 1933 from Saskatoon riding. The Saskatoon City riding was abolished in 1947 when it was redistributed into Rosthern, Rosetown—Biggar and Saskatoon  ridings.

Members of Parliament
This riding has elected the following member of the House of Commons of Canada:

Election results

See also 
 List of Canadian federal electoral districts
 Past Canadian electoral districts

External links 
 

Former federal electoral districts of Saskatchewan